The Mariental Solar Power Station is a  solar power plant in Namibia. The project is owned and was developed by a consortium of various IPPs and the Namibian electricity utility company, NamPower.

Location

The geographical coordinates of Mariental Solar Power Station are 24°39'10.0"S, 18°01'38.0"E (Latitude:-24.652778, Longitude:18.027222).

Overview
The power purchase agreement with the government of Namibia specifies that 37 megawatts are supplied to NamPower, for integration into the national grid.

Developers
The power station was developed by a consortium called Alten Energy Consortium (AEC). The table below illustrates the shareholding in AEC, as of June 2019.

The three Namibian investment companies are owned by women and represent Namibians, who were previously marginalised.

Construction costs, and commissioning
Construction started in 2018 and the power station was commissioned on 20 June 2019. Standard Bank of South Africa and Proparco, a subsidiary of Agence française de développement (French Development Agency), provided loans and bank guarantees for the development of this renewable energy infrastructure project.

See also

List of power stations in Namibia
Khan Solar Power Station

References

External links
 ALTEN – Mariental Solar Power Plant 45.5 MW – Namibia As of September 2018.

Solar power stations in Namibia
Mariental, Namibia
2019 establishments in Namibia
Energy infrastructure completed in 2019